Eric Newkirt Singleton (born November 6, 1968), also known as Eric XL Singleton or XLarge, is an American former rapper who has appeared on many dance music productions, significantly on Modern Talking songs, such as "You're My Heart, You're My Soul '98", "Space Mix ’98", "You Are Not Alone", "Sexy Sexy Lover", "China in Her Eyes", "Don't Take Away My Heart" and "Last Exit to Brooklyn".

Biography 
Singleton was born in New York City. Since 1994, he has worked with different music producers. He worked with unknown bands in Germany, like Face II Face, Deep Down and Cool Cut. He gained fame mainly through his appearances as rapper for Modern Talking. He appeared for the first time on the comeback version of "You're My Heart, You're My Soul" in 1998, then for the next few years he was heard on every single Modern Talking song released, until "Last Exit to Brooklyn" in 2001 (except "Win the Race").

In 2000, he released his first solo single, "Sexy Girl", featuring Shaggy.

After his last single with Modern Talking, he moved back to Georgia, U.S.

External links 
 Eric Singleton at Discogs

1968 births
Living people
American rappers
American male musicians
Modern Talking
21st-century American rappers